The Kauaeranga River is a river of New Zealand's North Island. One of the main rivers on the Coromandel Peninsula, it rises in the Coromandel Range which forms the backbone of the peninsula, flowing southwest through the Kauaeranga Valley to reach the Firth of Thames at Thames.

Apart from ammoniacal nitrogen, water quality is generally good.

See also
List of rivers of New Zealand

References

Sources

Thames-Coromandel District
Rivers of Waikato
Rivers of New Zealand
Firth of Thames
Hauraki Gulf catchment